The Flèche Enghiennoise was a short-lived men's cycling race organized for the last time in 1969. The course, around 200 km, was situated in Enghien, on the border of the Belgian provinces Brabant and Hainaut.

The race always took place in the second half of April.

The competition's roll of honor includes the successes of Rik Van Looy, Roger Pingeon and Felice Gimondi.

Winners

References 

Cycle races in Belgium
Defunct cycling races in Belgium
1965 establishments in Belgium
1969 disestablishments in Belgium
Recurring sporting events established in 1965
Recurring sporting events disestablished in 1969